Acinetobacter bohemicus is a bacterium from the genus Acinetobacter which has been isolated from soil and water ecosystems in the Czech Republic.

References

External links 
Type strain of Acinetobacter bohemicus at BacDive -  the Bacterial Diversity Metadatabase

Moraxellaceae
Bacteria described in 2015